The 121st (Western Irish) Battalion, CEF was a unit in the Canadian Expeditionary Force during the First World War. Based in New Westminster, British Columbia, the unit was authorized on 22 December 1915 and began recruiting in that city. The 121st (Western Irish) Battalion, CEF had one Officer Commanding: Lieutenant-Colonel Archibald Woodbury McLelan.

The 121st Battalion is perpetuated by The British Columbia Regiment (Duke of Connaught's Own). The perpetuation has been passed down through the following units as a result of reorganizations and amalgamations:

 1920–1936: 1st Battalion (121st Battalion, CEF), The Irish Fusiliers of Canada
 1936–1946: Irish Fusiliers (Vancouver Regiment)
 1946–1958: 65th Light Anti-Aircraft Regiment (Irish Fusiliers), RCA
 1958–2002: The Irish Fusiliers of Canada (The Vancouver Regiment)
 2002–present: The British Columbia Regiment (Duke of Connaught's Own)

References
Meek, John F. Over the Top! The Canadian Infantry in the First World War. Orangeville, Ont.: The Author, 1971.

Battalions of the Canadian Expeditionary Force
Irish units and formations of Canada
Military units and formations established in 1915
Military units and formations disestablished in 1917